Havering College may refer to:

Havering College of Further and Higher Education
Havering Sixth Form College